is a beat 'em up developed and published by 5pb. and originally released on February 27, 2013. it is a spin-off of the fighting game Phantom Breaker.

On March 12, 2013, a downloadable content add-on, the "Kurisu Pack," was released which adds Makise Kurisu from the Steins;Gate franchise as a playable character and raises the maximum character level. On November 18, 2016 two additional DLC packs were released, the "Frau Pack" adds Frau Kōjiro from the Robotics;Notes franchise as a playable character, while the "BGM Pack" adds programmable sound generator and frequency modulation versions of the background music. The game was featured in the official music video of "Move" by I Fight Dragons.

Plot
In Phantom Breaker: Battle Grounds players play as chibi versions of Mikoto, Waka, Itsuki and Yuzuha as they fight against large groups of enemies. Their friend, Nagi, has been captured by Phantom and the girls must go through hordes of Phantom's minions to try and rescue her, with each one having unique encounters and dialogue with the enemies.

Ports
A PlayStation Vita version was released on March 13, 2014 in Japan. The game was released in Europe on July 30, 2014 and North America on August 12, 2014. It is the first Vita game released worldwide by 5pb., and, according to producer Masaki Sakari, involved a number of hurdles relating to regional certification. A Microsoft Windows port was later announced, which would be published by Degica and was released on January 23, 2015. An enhanced port for the PlayStation 4, entitled Phantom Breaker: Battle Grounds Overdrive had also been announced and was released on July 21, 2015. A Nintendo Switch port of Overdrive was released on December 7, 2017, adding in additional content not found in previous versions, but lacking the online functionality of the original.

Reception

References

External links
 Official website
 Official website (Overdrive)

2013 video games
Beat 'em ups
Video games about ninja
Nintendo Switch games
PlayStation 4 games
PlayStation Network games
PlayStation Vita games
Retro-style video games
Video games developed in Japan
Video games featuring female protagonists
Video games scored by Takeshi Abo
Video games with 2.5D graphics
Xbox 360 Live Arcade games
Windows games